The 1996 ATP Tour World Championships and the Phoenix ATP Tour World Doubles Championships were tennis tournaments played on indoor carpet courts. It was the 27th edition of the year-end singles championships, the 23rd edition of the year-end doubles championships and both were part of the 1996 ATP Tour. The singles tournament took place at the EXPO 2000 Tennis Dome in Hanover in Germany from November 19 through November 24, 1996, while the doubles tournament took place at the Hartford Civic Center in Hartford, Connecticut, in the United States from November 13 through November 17, 1996.

Champions

Singles

 Pete Sampras defeated  Boris Becker 3–6, 7–6(7–5), 7–6(7–4), 6–7(11–13), 6–4
 It was Sampras' 8th title of the year and the 45th of his career. It was his 3rd year-end championships title.
 Boris Becker started off the first game of first set with four aces in a row.

Doubles

 Todd Woodbridge /  Mark Woodforde defeated  Sébastien Lareau /  Alex O'Brien 6–4, 5–7, 6–2, 7–6(7–3).
 It was Woodbridge's 12th title of the year and the 52nd of his career. It was Woodforde's 13th title of the year and the 56th of his career.

References

External links
 Official website

 
ATP Tour World Championships
ATP Finals
Tennis tournaments in Germany
Tennis tournaments in the United States
Sport in Hanover
Sports in Hartford, Connecticut
Sports competitions in Hartford, Connecticut
ATP Tour World Championships
ATP Tour World Championships
ATP Tour World Championships